Val de Vie Estate (Fr Valley of Life) is a secure, luxury residential and outdoor lifestyle estate occupying  situated between Stellenbosch, Paarl and Franschhoek in the Cape Winelands of South Africa.

The estate encompasses various neighbourhoods each with its own characteristics, surrounded by vineyards, polo fields, natural fynbos vegetation, parks, lakes and mountains.

The estate is known for its world-class polo facilities, Jack Nicklaus Signature Golf Course, mountain bike trails and L’Huguenot wine cellar.

Home to the “Safest House in Africa”,
 Val de Vie Estate has been named the number one residential estate in South Africa by New World Wealth for 5 consecutive years from 2015 to 2019.

Val de Vie Estate has also received awards for the Best Individual Residence in South Africa (2019), best Multigenerational Resort in the World (2018), Best Residential Development in South Africa (2020), as well as both Best Leisure Development in the World and Best Residential Development in South Africa, at the 2021 International Property Awards, and was placed in the top 10 lifestyle estates in the world for 2021 by New World Wealth.

History

The estate encompasses farmland granted by the Governor of the Cape to French Huguenot Abraham Andries le Roux in 1783 at a time when the Paarl-Franschhoek region was producing the highest volume of wine in South Africa.

Founder Martin Venter bought the land in 2003 and the first homes were built in 2007. In 2016 African Rainbow Capital acquired a 20% stake in Val de Vie Investments.

In 2015 Val de Vie and a consortium of partners acquired the adjacent Pearl Valley Golf & Country Estate from Standard Bank, after Pearl Valley went into business rescue.

The Competition Commission approved acquisition included the entire first phase of Pearl Valley, the Jack Nicklaus Signature Golf Course, the clubhouse, a hotel site on which the Mantis Collection Pearl Valley Hotel would be developed, a 20 hectare equestrian farm, approximately 80 serviced and unsold plots as well as 150 un-serviced residential plots.

Security

Val de Vie Estate was voted “Safest Estate in Africa”, and is home to the “Safest House in Africa”.

Awards

In 2019, New World Wealth's research ranked Val de Vie 'South Africa's Top Residential Estate' for the fifth consecutive year.

Best Single Unit Residential Development in Africa (The Valentia Manor House) - 2016 International Property Awards in Dubai.

Pearl Valley was rated by Golf Digest in South Africa’s Top 5 for 2018 and 2019 and the best conditioned golf course in the Western Cape.

Val de Vie Estate was awarded the 'Best Multigenerational Resort in the World' in 2018 at The Globals ceremony in London on 8 November 2018.

At the 2020 International Property Awards, Val de Vie won the award for 'Best Residential Development in South Africa' and Val de Vie Evergreen won the award for 'Best Leisure Development in Africa'.

At the 2021 International Property Awards, Val de Vie won awards for both 'Best Leisure Development in the World' and 'Best Residential Development in South Africa'.

New World Wealth placed Val de Vie in the top 10 lifestyle estates in the world for 2021

Sports

Golf 
The Pearl Valley Jack Nicklaus Signature Golf Course is rated by Golf Digest in South Africa’s Top 5 for 2018 and 2019 as well as rated the best conditioned golf course in the Western Cape. South Africa's Top 100 Courses rate Pearl Valley the number one golf course in the Western Cape and place it second nationwide.

Polo

Val de Vie Estate is the only residential Polo estate in South Africa and the venue for the annual Veuve Clicquot Masters Polo Cape Town. The 2009 event attracted more than 3 000 spectators.

The sixth Sentebale Royal Salute Polo Cup was played at Val de Vie Estate, His Royal Highness Prince Harry participated.

Val de Vie Estate is the host for the Veuve Clicquot Polo Series 2019/2020.

Cycling

In 2017 the Estate became the official Grand Finale venue, the Champs-Elysées of the 700 km Absa Cape Epic. The 17th edition will take place from 15 to 22 March 2020. The Absa Cape Epic is the largest full-service mountain bike stage race in the world and the only eight-day mountain bike stage race classed as hors catégorie by the Union Cycliste Internationale (UCI).

Events

An open-air concert by Andrea Bocelli and the Cape Town Philharmonic Orchestra attracted an audience of 12 000.

Boyzone Irish singer Ronan Keating and Grand Slam golf veteran Gary Player hosted a charity event at Val de Vie raising R1 433 000 for The Gary Player Foundation and the Red Cross War Memorial Children's Hospital Oncology Unit.

Wine

The history of winemaking on the estate dates back to the 17th Century when French Huguenot Abraham Andries le Roux employed his expertise in viticulture. L’Huguenot Vinoteque currently produces the Val de Vie and Polo Club labels.

Val de Vie started producing Rhône-style wines in 2006, and is now the most comprehensive grower of Rhône varietals outside of France.

The  under vine produce a variety of cultivars: Roussanne, Ugni Blanc, Durif, Cinsaut, Mourvedre, Shiraz, Carignan, Viognier, Clairette Blanche, Grenache Blanc, Grenache Noir and Merlot. The winery produces 5000 cases per annum.

The signature Val de Vie wine, is named after the Olympic Swimming Record Holder and Val de Vie Group Marketing Director, Ryk Neethling.

Biodiversity and conservation

As a major part of the Berg River valley falls within the Cape Floral Kingdom (a proclaimed World Heritage Site) the developers worked closely with the Western Cape Department of Environmental Affairs and Development Planning to preserve, protect, enhance, restore, manage and sustain the natural assets.

A  game reserve is home to endangered species like the Cape Grysbok. Over 100 species of protected fynbos flourish in dedicated environmentally sensitive areas.

Val de Vie Estate is home to over 50 avian species, including Cape Canaries, Greater Striped Swallow and Rock Martins, Whiterumped Swift and White-throated Swallow, African Paradise Flycatcher Kingfishers and Black Duck.

The 7 km biodiversity corridor along the Berg River is the second largest in the Western Cape and part of the Cape Floral Kingdom.

Foundation

The Val de Vie Foundation supports the local community with contributions to education, welfare and social/sporting development and other charitable initiatives.
	
It is funded through 1% of land sales and 5% of new home levies.

Between 2017 and 2019 The Foundation invested R13.4m in forty organisations

References

External links
 Val de Vie official website

Real estate companies of South Africa
Golf clubs and courses in South Africa
Golf clubs and courses designed by Jack Nicklaus
Polo venues
Equestrian sports in South Africa
Cape Epic
Wineries of South Africa
Wine companies
Resorts in South Africa
Economy of the Western Cape